"It's in Your Eyes" is a single performed by Phil Collins and released in 1996 as the second single from his album Dance into the Light.

A Beatles-esque melody, both melodically and lyrically - closing mirroring The Beatles song, "Anytime at All", the song only reached #30 UK Singles Chart and fared worse on the U.S. Billboard Hot 100, reaching #77. However, the song did reach the top 10 on the Billboard Hot Adult Contemporary Tracks chart.

For promotional live performances of the song, Collins played the lead guitar instead of Daryl Stuermer. The video showed Collins in an apartment block, playing the guitar while watching people pass by through their flats.

Track listings

Version 1
"It's in Your Eyes" – 3:02
"Always" (Bigband Live At Montreux 1996) – 4:52
"I Don't Want to Go" – 2:51

Version 2
"It's in Your Eyes" – 3:02
"Easy Lover" (Recorded Live '94 From The Board Official Bootleg) – 5:01
"Separate Lives" (Recorded Live '94 From The Board Official Bootleg) – 6:15

Charts

Weekly charts

Year-end charts

Credits 
 Phil Collins – drums, vocals, keyboards, lead and rhythm guitars
 Daryl Stuermer – rhythm guitar
 Ronnie Caryl – rhythm guitar
 Nathan East – bass

Notes

References

1996 singles
Phil Collins songs
Song recordings produced by Phil Collins
Song recordings produced by Hugh Padgham
Songs written by Phil Collins
1996 songs
Atlantic Records singles
Virgin Records singles
Warner Music Group singles